This is a list of minister from Neiphiu Rio fourth cabinet starting from December 2013. Neiphiu Rio is the leader of Nationalist Democratic Progressive Party was sworn in the Chief Ministers of Nagaland on 8 March 2018. The ministry had 12 Cabinet ministers including the Chief Minister. The following is the list of ministers of his ministry.

In the current government, 5 incumbents including the Chief Minister belongs to the NDPP, while 6 ministers including the Deputy Chief Minister belongs to the BJP.1 Minister is an Independent MLA.

Council of Ministers

Former Ministers

See also 

 Government of Nagaland
 Nagaland Legislative Assembly

References

Bharatiya Janata Party
Nationalist Democratic Progressive Party
Janata Dal (United)
Lists of current Indian state and territorial ministries
2018 in Indian politics
Rio 04
2018 establishments in Nagaland
Cabinets established in 2018